Malazjan (also Romanized as Malāzjān, Melāzjān, and Molāzjān) is a village in Kenarrudkhaneh Rural District, in the Central District of Golpayegan County, Isfahan Province, Iran. At the 2006 census, its population was 276, in 91 families.

References 

Populated places in Golpayegan County